An automated tank cleaning machine is a machine used to clean cargo, process, underground storage tanks and similar equipment such as those found in tank trucks,  railroad cars, barges, oil tankers, food and beverage manufacturing facilities, chemical processing plants, ethanol plants, and brewing facilities.  Genericized trademarks such as Gamajet and Butterworth machine  are often used to refer to automatic tank cleaning machines regardless of their manufacturer.

Operation
Tanks must be cleaned from time to time for various reasons. One reason is to change the type of product carried inside a tank to prevent cross contamination. Another is to allow the tank to be inspected or for maintenance to be performed within a tank and to prevent product build-up on tank interior walls.

Automated tank cleaning machines work in a manner similar to an irrigation sprinkler but are highly-engineered to deliver increased force. Water forced through rotary jet nozzles rotates the device on a dual axis, creating a 360° cleaning pattern. As the water sprays, the liquid is pumped out of the tank. Portable cleaning systems are commonly used for many outdoor applications while fixed or permanent Clean-in-Place (CIP) systems are used in more sanitary environments.

The Alfa Laval Gamajet 8 is widely used in the chemical industry, ethanol, transport, brewing, municipality, and oilfield/fuel storage applications. Weighing only 15 lbs., the device maintains 40 lbs. of cleaning force at 25 feet. Typical cleaning cycles are completed in 12 minutes.

The Butterworth Type K machine is widely used.

On most crude-oil tankers, a special crude oil washing system, or COW system, is part of the cleaning process. The COW system circulates hot crude oil through the fixed tank-cleaning system to remove wax and asphaltic deposits.

Although machines are often used to wash tanks, a final stage of manual cleaning known as mucking, is usually performed. Mucking requires protocols for entry into confined spaces and the use of airline respirators, protective clothing and safety observers.

However, with Gamajet tank cleaning machines, confined space entry is greatly reduced eliminating danger to workers. Manual tank cleaning is dangerous in a number of ways. While tank barges can be cleaned in port, shipboard tanks are generally cleaned at sea. This is largely due to risks of fire and explosion inside the tanks.

History
The first automated tank cleaning machine was invented by Arthur Butterworth and patented in 1920. His goal was to limit the amount of time that workers had to spend inside tanks, and partially relieve them of a dangerous and laborious job. In 1925, Butterworth established a company to market the machine. Standard Oil New Jersey bought the company in 1930, and it later became a subsidiary of the Exxon Corporation.

In 1986, as part of an internal restructuring at Exxon, the Butterworth company was sold to Exxon management. Today the company is privately held, and headquartered in Houston, Texas.

In 2012, Gamajet Cleaning Systems, Inc. was purchased by Alfa Laval to combine two global tank cleaning product lines, Gamajet and Toftejorg. The tank cleaning segment operates in Exton, Pennsylvania.

See also
Oil tanker
Chemical tanker

Notes

References
 

 

Petroleum technology
Tankers
Food industry
Storage tanks